Abdul Al-Ghadi (born 26 September 1962) is a Yemeni former track and field athlete. He competed for North Yemen at the 1984 Summer Olympic Games in the men's 800 m and finished eighth in his heat and failed to progress.

References

External links
 

1962 births
Living people
Yemeni male middle-distance runners
Olympic athletes of North Yemen
Athletes (track and field) at the 1984 Summer Olympics